Noah Lewis (born 23 August 2000) is a Dutch football player, he plays as a defender for St Patrick's Athletic in the League of Ireland Premier Division.

Club career

Youth career
Born in Almere, Lewis started out playing with Waterwijk, before joining Almere City at the age of 11, where he spent 1 year before joining Feyenoord Academy in 2012. He spent 7 years playing at Youth level for Feyenoord, featuring in the Beloften Eredivisie, KNVB Reserve Cup, Premier League International Cup and UEFA Youth League.

Feyenoord
Lewis made his first team debut for Feyenoord on 21 March 2018, replacing Sven van Beek from the bench in a 4–0 win over ADO Den Haag in a friendly.

FC Dordrecht loan
In July 2019, he was loaned out to Eerste Divisie side FC Dordrecht until 2 January 2020. He made a total of 10 appearances in the league and 2 more in the KNVB Cup.

Willem II
Lewis signed for Eredivisie side Willem II in September 2021. He featured mainly for the club's reserve side but was an unused substitute in 3 of the first team's Eredivisie games during the season as they were relegated to the Eerste Divisie.

St Patrick's Athletic
On 26 January 2023, Lewis signed for League of Ireland Premier Division club St Patrick's Athletic. Manager Tim Clancy revealed that the opportunity to sign Lewis came about after a move to a UK club collapsed after Lewis failed to obtain a work permit for that country as he did not meet the criteria following a rule change due to Brexit.

International career
Lewis made his Netherlands U17 debut on 12 February 2017 in a 2–1 loss to Portugal U17. In October 2018, he was an unused substitute for Netherlands U19 in their 5–0 win over Faroe Islands U19, 6–0 win over Bosnia and Herzegovina U19 and their 2–1 loss to Republic of Ireland U19.

Career statistics

References

External links
 

2000 births
Living people
Dutch footballers
Dutch expatriate footballers
Association football defenders
Netherlands youth international footballers
Feyenoord players
FC Dordrecht players
Willem II (football club) players
St Patrick's Athletic F.C. players
Eerste Divisie players
League of Ireland players
Expatriate association footballers in the Republic of Ireland
People from Almere
Footballers from Almere